Well is a small village and civil parish in the Hart district of Hampshire, England. It is in the civil parish of Long Sutton. It is adjacent to Lord Wandsworth College. The local pub is called The Chequers Inn.

External links 

 The Chequers Inn
 Hampshire Treasures p111 The Old Cottage. Pond House.
 Hampshire Treasures p112 Well Manor Farmhouse.

Villages in Hampshire